SerDes Framer Interface is a standard for telecommunications abbreviated as SFI.  Variants include:

 SFI-4 or SerDes Framer Interface Level 4, a standardized Electrical Interface by the Optical Internetworking Forum (OIF) for connecting a synchronous optical networking (SONET) framer component to an optical serializer/deserializer (SerDes) for Optical Carrier transmission rate OC-192 interfaces at about 10 Gigabits per second.
 SFI-5  or SerDes Framer Interface Level 5, a standardized Electrical Interface by the OIF for connecting a SONET Framer component to an optical SerDes for OC-768, about 40 Gbit/s.   Electrically, it consists of 16 pairs of SerDes channels each running at 3.125 Gbit/s which gives an aggregate bandwidth of 50 Gbit/s accommodating up to 25% of Forward Error Correction

See also 
 XFP transceiver
 System Packet Interface
 Common Electrical I/O

References

External links 
 OIF
 OFI SFI-5 Implementation Agreement

Fiber-optic communications
Networking hardware